

Results
Scores and results list France's points tally first.

1964 rugby union tours
1964
1964 in South African rugby union
1963–64 in French rugby union
1964